Rani Rosius (born 25 April 2000) is a Belgian sprinter.

At just 21 years of age, Rosius tied the second-best Belgian time ever on the 100 metres event, with a time of 11.39. Olivia Borlée ran the same time in 2007, while only Kim Gevaert ever ran faster, still holding the Belgian record at 11.04.

Personal bests
Outdoor
100 metres – 11.28 (Gentbrugge 2022)
100 metres - 11.16 (Tallinn 2021), but with a tailwind of 3.0 m/s the record is invalid.
200 metres – 23.49 (Brussels 2021)

Indoor
60 metres – 7.16 (Istanbul 2023)
200 metres – 24.36 (Louvain-la-Neuve 2020)

References

2000 births
Belgian female sprinters
Belgian Athletics Championships winners
Place of birth missing (living people)
Living people